The 2017 Asian Women's U23 Volleyball Championship was the 2nd edition of the Asian Women's U23 Volleyball Championship, a biennial international volleyball tournament organised by the Asian Volleyball Confederation (AVC) with Thailand Volleyball Association (TVA). It was held in Nakhon Ratchasima, Thailand from 13 to 21 May 2017. The tournament will serve as the Asian qualifiers for the 2017 FIVB Volleyball Women's U23 World Championship held in Ljubljana and Maribor, Slovenia with the top two ranked teams qualifying for the world championship.

The matches was played in only one stadium in Nakhon Ratchasima: The Mall Nakhon Ratchasima. It was the first time that Thailand and Nakhon Ratchasima had hosted the tournament. As hosts, Thailand automatically participated for the tournament, while the remaining 12 teams (with the withdrawn of South Korea, China, and Philippines).

Participated teams

Pools composition
The teams were seeded based on their final ranking at the 2015 Asian Women's U23 Volleyball Championship. The host country and the top 7 ranked teams were seed in the Serpentine system. The 7 remaining teams were drawn on 27 February 2017 in Bangkok, Thailand.

Ranking from the previous edition was shown in brackets except the host (who ranked 2nd) and the teams who did not participate, which were denoted by (-).

China and South Korea withdraw prior to the draw.
Philippines withdraw after to the draw.

Venue
The tournament was hosted in MCC HALL The Mall Nakhon Ratchasima, located in Mueang Nakhon Ratchasima, Nakhon Ratchasima.

Squads 

Players born after 1 January 1995 are eligible to compete in the tournament. Each team can register a maximum of 12 players.

Pool standing procedure
 Numbers of matches won
 Match points
 Sets ratio
 Points ratio
 Result of the last match between the tied teams

Match won 3–0 or 3–1: 3 match points for the winner, 0 match points for the loser
Match won 3–2: 2 match points for the winner, 1 match point for the loser

Preliminary round
All times are Indochina Time (UTC+07:00).

Pool A

|}

|}

Pool B

|}

|}

Pool C

|}

|}

Pool D

|}

|}

Second round
The results and the points of the matches between the same teams that were already played during the preliminary round shall be taken into account for the classification round
All times are Indochina Time (UTC+07:00).

Pool E

|}

|}

Pool F

|}

|}

Pool G

|}

|}

Pool H

|}

|}

Classification round
All Times are Indochina Time (UTC+07:00).

Eleventh place match

|}

Ninth place match

|}

Final round
All times are Indochina Time (UTC+07:00).

Bracket

Quarter-finals

|}

Fifth place play-offs

|}

Semi-finals

|}

Seventh place match

|}

Fifth place match

|}

Third place match

 
|}

Final

|}

Final standing

Medalists

Awards

Most Valuable Player
 Misaki Yamauchi
Best Outside Spikers
 Chatchu-on Moksri
 Trần Thị Thanh Thuý
Best Setter
 Miki Sukurai

Best Opposite Spiker
 Pimpichaya Kokram
Best Middle Blocker
 Ayaka Sugi
 Hathairat Jarat
Best Libero
 Li Xiang-chen

Broadcasting rights

See also
 2017 Asian Men's U23 Volleyball Championship

References

External links
Official website
Regulations
Teams composition

U23, 2017
2017 in Thai sport
Women's volleyball in Thailand
2017 in women's volleyball
International volleyball competitions hosted by Thailand
Sport in Nakhon Ratchasima province